Ernest James Keeley (26 May 1890 – 23 July 1918) was a South African sports shooter. He competed in four events at the 1912 Summer Olympics. 

He was killed in action in Belgium during World War I while serving as a Second Lieutenant in the 4th Regiment of South African Infantry, and, having no known grave, is commemorated on the Commonwealth Ploegsteert Memorial.

See also
 List of Olympians killed in World War I

References

1890 births
1918 deaths
South African male sport shooters
Olympic shooters of South Africa
Shooters at the 1912 Summer Olympics
South African Republic people
Sportspeople from Pretoria
South African military personnel killed in World War I
South African Army officers
20th-century South African people